24 Gadi Iru (lit: 24 hours) is a 2014 Maldivian suspense thriller film directed by Yoosuf Shafeeu and Mohamed Rasheed. Co-produced by Ismail Shafeeq and Mohamed Rasheed under Hi-Raid Productions, the film stars Yoosuf Shafeeu, Fathimath Azifa and Sara Mayrhuber in pivotal roles. The film was released on 28 August 2014. The film revolved around a romantic relationship between a girl diagnosed with mental illness and her psychiatrist. Production of the film began in 2010, though it was theatrically released four years later.

Plot

Reesha, a girl with bipolar disorder and heart problem, Fell in love with her psychiatrist Dr. Visham. Visham treats his patients with love and care, so Reesha mistaken it as true love. However, Visham is married to a foreigner named Sara, and doesn't have any feelings for Reesha. Reesha is admant, and want to marry Visham at any cost. She threatened him to commit suicide and frame him for having an affair with her. Visham rebuked her words as she only threatened to commit suicide.

However, Reesha, actually committed suicide, and her father beg Visham to marry her. Visham, agreed to marry Reesha for only 24 hours, after which he will divorce her. But Reesha turn the table by saying that the 24 hours will be completed the way she wants. Visham spend most night with Reesha and fell for her. This had a negative impact on Visham and Sara's relationship, and Sara started to feel insecure.

Reesha's heart problem became worse. She tell Visham through a letter that she misunderstood his treatment for his love and wanted to Marry and have kids with him. She confess that she wanted to separate Visham and Sara, and was pregnant with his child. She beg Visham for his forgiveness and request him to upbring their child with Sara.

The film ends with Sara accepting, Reesha's child and upbringing him with Visham.

Cast 
 Yoosuf Shafeeu as Dr. Visham. A psychiatrist, Sara and Reesha's husband 
 Fathimath Azifa as Reesha, Visham's second wife
 Koyya Hassan Manik as Hamid, Reesha's father 
 Sara Mayrhuber as Dr. Sara. A gynaecologist, Visham's first wife
 Muflihaa as Fareedha, Reesha's personal nurse. 
 Mohamed Waheed as Bakur
 Mohamed Rasheed as Yasir
 Ahmed Aman Ali as doctor
 Ahmed Rifau as office boy
 Fathimath Eera as patient
 Maisha Ahmed as receptionist
 Mariyam Sama as secretary
 Nashith as secretary

Soundtrack

Release and reception
The film was released on 28 August 2014. The film was released after being in production for four years. The film received mixed reception from critics. Ahmed Nadheem of Haveeru favored the background music, starting of film and its execution while criticizing the flow of its presentation; "The flow of the film was lost after a sudden and led to a rushed climax creating no suspense or whatsoever. The film failed to be marked as a "different" film but the work is encouraging".

Accolades

References

2014 films
2014 thriller films
Maldivian thriller films
Films directed by Yoosuf Shafeeu
Films directed by Mohamed Rasheed